Richard Gosling (born 1974) is the winner of Britain's Strongest Man contest in 2003. He currently lives in Cannock, England.

Injury
Gosling was seriously injured in August 2001 when he was working as a doorman at a nightclub in Cannock. His attacker was given a life sentence for wounding with intent to cause grievous bodily harm.

External links
Cannock man is Britain's strongest at BBC News

1974 births
Living people
English strength athletes
People from Cannock